The following events occurred in January 1953:

January 1, 1953 (Thursday)
The National Library of Canada is established in Ottawa.
The United States Army officially gives up its glider capability.
 Died: Hank Williams, 29, American musician. Williams' death was attributed to multiple causes, including a heart condition, drugs and injuries from a recent beating.

January 2, 1953 (Friday)
Died: Guccio Gucci, 71, Italian designer and businessman

January 3, 1953 (Saturday)
American politician Oliver P. Bolton begins his first term in the US Congress, where his mother, Frances P. Bolton, is already serving. They thus become the first mother and son to serve simultaneously in Congress.

January 4, 1953 (Sunday)
 Died: Yasuhito, Prince Chichibu, Japanese prince (b. 1902)

January 5, 1953 (Monday)
 A British European Airways Vickers VC.1 Type 610 Viking 1B Lord St. Vincent hits an approach light and crashes into a building at Nutts Corner Airport near Belfast in Northern Ireland, killing 27 of the 35 people on board.

January 6, 1953 (Tuesday)
 The Asian Socialist Conference opened in Rangoon, Burma.
In New Zealand, Godfrey Bowen sets a world sheep shearing record by shearing 456 sheep in nine hours.
In the UK, the Broadcasting Council for Wales meets for the first time.

January 7, 1953 (Wednesday)
 U.S. President Harry S. Truman announced the United States had developed a hydrogen bomb.
 Died: Osa Johnson, American adventurer and documentary filmmaker (b. 1894)
Capitol Wrestling Corporation, the professional wrestling promotion that will later evolve into the modern day WWE, is founded by Jess McMahon and Toots Mondt.

January 8, 1953 (Thursday)
Radical politician René Mayer forms a government and begins a period of less than six months as Prime Minister of France.

January 9, 1953 (Friday)
 Chang Cheong-ho, a South Korean passenger ship, capsizes in strong wind near the Port of Busan, according to local coast guard officials. 229 persons are confirmed killed.    
 Died: Marguerite Pitre (aka Madame le Corbeau), 44, Canadian murderer, the last woman to be hanged in Canada

January 10, 1953 (Saturday)
Born: Pat Benatar, American singer-songwriter, in Brooklyn, New York

January 11, 1953 (Sunday)
New Zealand's Social Credit Political League is formed from the earlier Social Credit Association.
Died: Ernst Herman van Rappard, 53, Dutch Nazi leader, of a brain haemorrhage while serving a life sentence in prison

January 12, 1953 (Monday)
 Estonian émigrés establish a government-in-exile in Oslo, Norway.

January 13, 1953 (Tuesday)
"Doctors' plot": The Soviet Union's state newspaper Pravda publishes an article alleging that many of the most prestigious physicians in the country, mostly Jews, are part of a major plot to poison the country's senior political and military leaders.
The 1953 Yugoslav Constitutional Law, a set of constitutional amendments, comes into force in Yugoslavia. Among other things, this establishes a Federal People's Assembly with two houses: a Federal Chamber, directly representing the regions, and a Chamber of Producers, representing economic enterprises and worker groups. 
 Died: Edward Marsh, 80, English polymath and civil servant

January 14, 1953 (Wednesday)
 Marshal Josip Broz Tito is chosen to be President of Yugoslavia.
 The CIA-sponsored Robertson Panel meets for the first time to discuss the recent wave of UFO incidents reported in the United States.

January 15, 1953 (Thursday)
 Georg Dertinger, foreign minister of East Germany, is arrested on suspicion of espionage.

January 16, 1953 (Friday)
 A United States Air Force Douglas C-54D-5-DC Skymaster crashes on its final approach to Ernest Harmon Air Force Base in Stephenville, Newfoundland, Canada, with 14 people on board. Only one survives.
 Died: Solomon Carter Fuller, 80, Liberian neurologist, psychiatrist, pathologist and teacher, one of the first black psychiatrists

January 17, 1953 (Saturday)
The 1953 Iraqi parliamentary election ends in victory for the Constitutional Union Party. Only 57 seats of the 135 seats are contested, and the Constitutional Union Party wins 67.

January 18, 1953 (Sunday)
The 1953 Guatemalan parliamentary election ends with the Revolutionary Action Party as the biggest party. 
The first elections to the new Assembly of French Polynesia take place, after it replaces the Representative Assembly. The Democratic Rally of the Tahitian People (RDPT) wins a majority.
Sinn Féin, Ireland's republican party, decides that it will contest all 12 constituencies in Northern Ireland in the next Westminster election.
The Argentine Grand Prix is held in Buenos Aires and is won by Alberto Ascari of Italy, in a Ferrari, beginning the Formula One season, though it is run according to Formula Two regulations because of a shortage of Formula One cars. Crowd control becomes impossible and a near-riot contributes to several crashes. Reports suggest that several spectators were killed.

January 19, 1953 (Monday)
 CBS shows "Lucy Goes to the Hospital", an episode of I Love Lucy in which Lucy (played by Lucille Ball) gives birth to her son. An estimated 44 million people in the United States watch the episode, more than will watch Dwight Eisenhower's inauguration the following day.
Born: Desi Arnaz Jr., at Cedars-Sinai Medical Center in Los Angeles, California, to Lucille Ball and Desi Arnaz. Later in the day, Lucy fictitiously gives birth to "Little Ricky" on screen.

January 20, 1953 (Tuesday)

 Dwight D. Eisenhower is sworn in as 34th President of the United States.
 Born: Jeffrey Epstein, American financier and convicted sex offender (d. 2019)

January 21, 1953 (Wednesday)
 Born: Larisa Shoigu, Russian politician, in Chadan (died 2021)
 Died: Mary Mannering, 76, English stage actress

January 22, 1953 (Thursday)
 The Crucible, a drama by Arthur Miller, opens on Broadway in New York. The play is an allegory of McCarthyism in the United States.

January 23, 1953 (Friday)

January 24, 1953 (Saturday)
 Mau Mau Uprising: Rebels in Kenya murder the Ruck family (Dr Roger Ruck, his pregnant wife Esme, and their young son). News of the death causes outrage.
 Walter Ulbricht announced that agriculture would be collectivized in East Germany.
 Born: Moon Jae-in, 19th President of the Republic of Korea

January 25, 1953 (Sunday)
 Russian speed skater Yuri Sergeev breaks his own world record for the 500 metres, at Medeu in Kazakhstan, with a time of 0.40,9.

January 26, 1953 (Monday)
In mountains near Sinnai, on the Italian island of Sardinia, a Linee Aeree Italiane Douglas C-47-DL Skytrain loses its left wing as a result of overstressing and crashes in mountainous terrain killing all 19 people on board.

January 27, 1953 (Tuesday)
The Canadian Dental Association recommends the fluoridation of drinking water.

January 28, 1953 (Wednesday)
 Died
Derek Bentley, 19, English criminal, hanged for murder at Wandsworth Prison in London while protests take place outside. Bentley's case will become a cause célèbre because the sentencing did not take account of his mental condition and the fact that he had not fired the shots that killed the police officer, which were fired by a minor who escaped capital punishment.
James Scullin, 76, 9th Prime Minister of Australia

January 29, 1953 (Thursday)
 Born: Teresa Teng, Taiwanese singer, in Yunlin County (d. 1995)

January 30, 1953 (Friday)
 Born: Steven Zaillian, US screenwriter, director, film editor, and producer, in Fresno, California

January 31, 1953 (Saturday)

 North Sea flood of 1953: Flooding breaks out in the Netherlands and the United Kingdom, continuing until February 1 and eventually resulting in the deaths of more than 2000 people.
Died: Maynard Sinclair, MP, 56, Northern Ireland Finance Minister and Deputy Prime Minister, and Sir Walter Smiles, 69, Ulster Unionist MP for North Down, both passengers on board MV Princess Victoria, an Irish Sea ferry, which sinks in stormy weather, resulting in 133 confirmed deaths. A further 44 people are rescued by other ships.

References

1953
1953-01
1953-01